Inishbofin may refer to: 
 Inishbofin, County Galway, Ireland
 Inishbofin, County Donegal, Ireland
See also:
Inchbofin, County Westmeath